Percival Steele Jackson (November 21, 1906 — September 16, 1972) was a Canadian professional ice hockey goaltender who played seven games in the National Hockey League between 1931 and 1936. Born in Canmore, Alberta, he played with the New York Americans, New York Rangers, and Boston Bruins.

Career statistics

Regular season and playoffs

External links 

1906 births
1972 deaths
Boston Bruins players
Boston Cubs players
Canadian ice hockey goaltenders
Ice hockey people from Alberta
New York Americans players
New York Rangers players
People from Canmore, Alberta
Philadelphia Ramblers players
Portland Buckaroos players
Providence Reds players
Tulsa Oilers (AHA) players
Vancouver Lions players